Mörarp is a locality situated in Helsingborg Municipality, Skåne County, Sweden with 1,893 inhabitants in 2010.

References 

Populated places in Helsingborg Municipality
Populated places in Skåne County